Kokkinogeio is a village and a community of the Elassona municipality. Before the 2011 local government reform it was a part of the municipality of Olympos, of which it was a municipal district. The 2011 census recorded 240 inhabitants in the village. The community of Kokkinogeio covers an area of 9.902 km2.

History
The settlement is recorded as village and as having two names one being "Timurlu" and the other being "Topolyana" in the Ottoman Tahrir Defter number 101 dating to 1521.

Population
According to the 2011 census, the population of the settlement of Kokkinogeio was 240 people, a decrease of almost 24% compared with the population of the previous census of 2001.

See also
 List of settlements in the Larissa regional unit

References

Populated places in Larissa (regional unit)